Saint Paisios of Mount Athos (secular name: Arsenios Eznepidis; 1924–1994), was a well-known Greek Eastern Orthodox ascetic from Mount Athos, originally from Pharasa, Cappadocia. He was respected for his spiritual guidance and ascetic life. Today, he is widely venerated by Eastern Orthodox Christians, particularly in Greece, Cyprus and in Russia.

Venerable Elder Paisios was canonized on 13 January 2015 by the Holy Synod of the Ecumenical Patriarchate, and the church commemorates his feast day on June 29 [OS] / July 12 [NS].

The Holy Synod of the Russian Orthodox Church decided at its meeting of 5 May 2015 also to add the name of the Venerable Paisios of Mount Athos to the Menology of the Russian Orthodox Church, establishing his feast day on June 29/July 12, aligning with the Menology of the Orthodox Church of Constantinople during the present century.

Biography
On , Arsenios Eznepidis was born in Pharasa (Çamlıca), Cappadocia, during the population exchange between Greece and Turkey. Arsenios' name was given to him by St. Arsenios the Cappadocian, who baptised him, naming the child for himself and foretelling Arsenios' monastic future. After the exchange, the Eznepidis family settled in Konitsa, Epirus. Arsenios grew up there, and after intermediate public school, he learned carpentry.

During the civil war in Greece, Arsenios served as a radio operator.

Monastic life

In 1950, having completed his service, he went to Mount Athos: first to Father Kyril, the future abbot of Koutloumousiou Monastery, and then to Esphigmenou Monastery (although he was not supportive of their later opposition to the Ecumenical Patriarchate).

Arsenios, having been a novice for four years, was tonsured a Rassophore monk on 27 March 1954, and was given the name Averkios.

Soon after, Father Averkios went to the (then) idiorrhythmic brotherhood of Philotheou monastery, where his uncle was a monk. While there, he was in obedience to Elder Symeon. On 12 March 1957, Elder Symeon tonsured Father Averkios to the Small Schema, giving him the name Paisios, in honour of the indefatigable Metropolitan of Caesarea, Paisios II, whose native village was Pharasa.

In 1958, Elder Paisios was asked to spend some time in and around his home village so as to support the faithful against the proselytism of Protestant groups. He greatly encouraged the faithful there, helping many people. Afterwards, in 1962, he left to visit Saint Catherine's Monastery on Sinai where he stayed for two years. During this time he became beloved of the Bedouins who benefited from his presence both spiritually as well as materially as the Elder used the money he received from the sale of his carved wooden handicraft to buy the Bedouins' food.

On his return to Mt. Athos in 1964, Elder Paisios took up residence at the Skete of Iviron before moving to Katounakia at the southernmost tip of Mt. Athos for a short stay in the wilderness there. The Elder's failing health may have been part of the reason for his departure from there. In 1966 he had an operation to remove part of his lungs. It was during this time of hospitalization that his long friendship with the then young sisterhood of St. John the Theologian in Souroti, just outside Thessaloniki, began. During his operation, he needed a large amount of blood and a group of novices from the monastery donated blood to save him.

In 1968 he spent time at the Monastery of Stavronikita. 

Elder Gabriel of the Cell of St. Christodoulos of Koutloumousiou Monastery was a disciple of St. Paisios the Athonite.

Timeline
1958: Father Paisios was asked to spend time in his home village to support the faithful against Protestantism.
1962: Father Paisios went to Saint Catherine's Monastery on Mount Sinai.
1964: On his return to Mount Athos, Father Paisios took up residence at the Iviron Monastery, then at Katounakia. His failing health may have led him to leave Katounakia.
1966: Father Paisios had an operation, and part of his lungs was removed. During this time, his friendship with the sisterhood of the Monastery of St. John the Theologian in Souroti, began. Elder Paisios would place the relics of St. Arsenios the Cappadocian in this monastery.
1966: On 11 January 1966, Father Paisios received the Great and Angelic Schema from Elder Tikhon, at the Hermitage of the Holy Cross, of the monastery of Stavronikita. After Elder Tikhon's death on 10 September 1968, Fr. Paisios resided in that hermitage.
1979: Elder Paisios moved to Panagouda, a hermitage belonging to Koutloumousiou Monastery. It was here that his renown grew. Between prayer and assisting his visitors, he only rested for two or three hours each night.
1993 October 5: Elder Paisios left Mount Athos for medical attention. Despite his wish to be gone for only a few days, he was diagnosed with cancer requiring immediate surgery, and after recovery, he was transferred to the Monastery of St. John the Theologian, Souroti.
 Despite wishing to return to Mount Athos, his health did not allow it.
1994 July 12: Having received Holy Communion the previous day, Elder Paisios died. He was buried at the Monastery of Saint John the Theologian in Souroti, next to the church of St Arsenios the Cappadocian.

Prophecies on geopolitical matters
A number of geopolitical prophecies have been credited to Elder Paisios. These include the prediction that a war between Turkey that will lead to the formation of the Greater Greece, and the liberation of other lands including Albania, the rest of Macedonia, and Byzantium (Constantinople), and the conversion of a part of the Turks from Islam to Orthodox Christianity. "The Turks shall be destroyed. They will be eradicated."

Hieromonk Makarios of Mount Athos collected some of St. Paisios' prophecies and published them in 1990 when the saint was still alive: "Words of Wisdom and Grace of the Elder Paisios the Hagioreite, I" (Greek).

Canonization

The Holy Synod of the Ecumenical Patriarchate canonized Elder Paisios on 13 January 2015. Paisios' process toward acknowledged sainthood happened quickly according to church standards and was the second-fastest process in recent church history. On Sunday 17 January 2015 many faithful from across the Balkans went on pilgrimage to the monastery in Souroti, which St. Paisios helped found in 1967; this culminated in five nights of continuous prayers. Archbishop Damianos of Sinai, abbot of St. Catherine's Orthodox Monastery in Egypt's Sinai peninsula since 1973, was also present at the ceremonies.

On Sunday 25 January 2015 the first church in the world to be dedicated to Saint Paisios the Athonite was consecrated in central Limassol, Cyprus, in the neighbourhood of Ekali, across from Tsirion Stadium. The sacred service began at 6 pm with the reception of the holy relics of Hieromartyr Heraclides, Bishop of Tamassos (September 17), of Saint Cosmas of Mount Athos, and of the New Martyr George of Cyprus (April 23). These were placed respectively in the three altars of the new church, which was thus dedicated to Saint Arsenios of Cappadocia (November 10), to Saint Paisios of Mount Athos (July 12), and to the holy Martyrs Barachisius and Jonah (March 29), given that the church in Pharasa, Cappadocia, which was Saint Arsenios' and Saint Paisios' village and place of birth, was dedicated in honour of the Martyrs Barachisius and Jonah.

On Saturday 11 July 2015, the first church in Greece to be dedicated to Saint Paisios was consecrated in Nea Efesos, Pieria. Metropolitan George (Chrysostomou) of Kitros, Katerini and Platamonas (el) officiated at the thyranoixia or consecration.

In 2017 on the feast day of Saint Paisios, Metropolitan Nikolaos (Protopappas) of Phthiotis remarked that "Saint Paisios was the saint of the dispirited and of sinners". While Metropolitan Seraphim (Papakostas) of Kastoria stated that "Saint Paisios is the response to those who question the presence of God".

On Sunday 24 February 2019, the first Athonite church dedicated to St. Paisios the Athonite was consecrated by Metropolitan Panteleimon (Kalafatis) of Xanthi. The church is located in Kapsala, in the area between Karyes and the monasteries of Pantocrator and Stavronikita, where there used to be a skete.

Published works
 Translated into English:
Saint Arsenios the Cappadocian, translated into English and published in 1989 and 2001 by Holy Monastery "Evangelist John the Theologian", Souroti, Thessaloniki, Greece.
Elder Hadji-Georgis the Athonite, translated into English and published in 1996 by Holy Monastery "Evangelist John the Theologian", Souroti, Thessaloniki, Greece.
Athonite Fathers and Athonite Matters, translated into English and published in 1999 by Holy Monastery "Evangelist John the Theologian", Souroti, Thessaloniki, Greece.
Epistles, by Elder Paisios of Mount Athos, translated into English and published in Feb 2002 by Holy Monastery "Evangelist John the Theologian", Souroti, Thessaloniki, Greece; distributed in the US by St. Herman of Alaska Monastery.
Spiritual Counsels, Vol. 1: With Pain and Love for Contemporary Man 
Spiritual Counsels, Vol. 2: Spiritual Awakening, 1999 & 2000. 
Spiritual Counsels, Vol. 3: Spiritual Struggle, 2001. 
Spiritual Counsels, Vol. 4: Family Life, 2012.
Spiritual Counsels, Vol. 5: Passions and Virtues, 2016.
Spiritual Counsels, Vol. 6: On Prayer, 2022.

 In Greek:
Λόγοι Ϛʹ· Περί Προσευχής, Ἱερὸν Ἡσυχαστήριον Μοναζουσῶν "Εὐαγγελιστὴς Ἰωάννης ὁ Θεολόγος". 2012 (Spiritual Counsels, Vol. 6: On Prayer, Holy Monastery "Evangelist John the Theologian". 2012)
Ὅσιος Παΐσιος ο Αγιορείτης, "Ωφέλιμες Διηγήσεις", Ιερά Μονή Αγίου Ιλαρίωνος Πρόμαχοι Αριδαίας. 2016 (a collection of written narratives of the saint found in his private notebook of notes, typed down and published)
Ὅσιος Παΐσιος ο Αγιορείτης, Σημεία των Καιρών ("Signs of The Time", handwritten letter of the saint towards the society on coming events and the future)
"Το Τετράδιο του Γέρωντος Παϊσίου", ed. Protopresbyter Georgios Manos, Ορθόδοξος Κυψέλη, 2009. (notices by the Saint on Metanoia and the Sacrament of Penance; printed with commentary and supplemental prayers)
Ὅσιος Παΐσιος ὁ Ἁγιορείτης, "Ὁ μικρὸς Ἀνθόκηπος - Ἁγιογραφικὰ καὶ πατερικὰ χωρία ἐπιλεγμένα ἀπὸ τὸν Ἃγιο Παΐσιο τὸν Ἁγιορείτη", ed. by Ἱερὸν Ἡσυχαστήριον "Εὐαγγελιστὴς Ἰωάννης ὁ Θεολόγος". Βασιλικά Θεσσαλονίκης, 2018. (The Garden of Flowers - quotes from the Church fathers and from hagiography selected by the Saint Paisios of the Holy Mountain)
"Γέρωντος Παϊσίου Αγιορείτου, Διδαχές και Αλληλογραφία", Εκδόσεις Η Μεταμόρφωσις του Σωτήρος, Μήλεσι. 2007 (teachings and correspondence of the saint)

Orthodox hymn
Kontakion
 Thou, O Father, didst say with words enlightened by the Holy Spirit that many saints would have desired to live in our times, in order to strive for salvation. 
 For Thou didst herald to us, who live in darkness, that the time is almost ready and that those that now struggle valiantly to win their salvation will receive a martyr's reward. 
 For this we thank God, Who with mercy looked on His people, sending His Saint for our enlightenment, and thus with voices of joy we gladly sing to our All-Gracious Master the song: Alleluia!

See also
 Porphyrios the Kausokalyvite
 Saint Paisios
 Elder Pastitsios

Notes

References

Sources
 Hieromonk Isaac. Saint Paisios of Mount Athos. Translated by Hieromonk Alexis (Trader) PhD, and Fr. Peter Heers. Edited by Hieromonk Alexis (Trader) PhD, Fr. Evdokimos (Goranitis) and Philip Navarro. 2nd Edition. Holy Monastery of "Saint Arsenios the Cappadocian", Chalkidiki, Greece, 2016.  (Exclusive distributor for U.S. and Canada St. Nektarios Monastery, Roscoe, NY.)
 Hieromonk Isaac. Elder Paisios of Mount Athos. Transl. Hieromonk Alexis (Trader) PhD, and Fr. Peter Heers. Ed. by Hieromonk Alexis (Trader) PhD, Fr. Evdokimos (Goranitis) and Philip Navarro. Holy Monastery of "Saint Arsenios the Cappadocian", Chalkidiki, Greece, 2012. 
 Middleton, Herman A. "Elder Paisios the Athonite". In: Precious Vessels of the Holy Spirit: The Lives & Counsels of Contemporary Elders of Greece. 2nd Ed. Protecting Veil Press, Thessalonica, Greece, 2004.
 Athanasios Rakovalis. "Talks with Father Paisios". Published in Thessaloniki in 2000. (Distributed by St. Nicodemos Publications)

External links
 Akathist to our Holy Father Paisius the Athonite. St. John the Wonderworker of San Francisco Church (ROCOR), Colchester, Essex England (Orthodox England). Retrieved: 21 January 2015.
 Elder Paisios: A short biography. Church of the Life-Giving Spring, in the Municipality of Vareia Mytilene (Metropolis of Mytilene). Retrieved 20 January 2015.
 Testimony by Metropolitan Athanasios of Limassol regarding Saint Paisios. Ecumenical Patriarchate - Orthodox Metropolitanate of Hong Kong and South East Asia (OMHKSEA). 13 January 2015. Retrieved 21 January 2015.
 Saint Paisios Athnonite - The Signalman of God. YouTube, 10 Jul 2014. (Length: 3:14:51). Retrieved 20 January 2015.
  Ιερός Ναός Αγίων Αρσενίου Καππαδόκου και Παϊσίου Αγιορείτου. (St Arsenios the Cappadocian and St Paisios the Athonite Church, Limassol, Cyprus)
  Άγιος Παΐσιος (Agios Pasios - Didaxes and Profiteies from Pater Paisios, Souroti, Greece)

1924 births
1994 deaths
20th-century apocalypticists
20th-century Christian saints
20th-century Christian mystics
Ascetics
Athonite Fathers
Cappadocian Greeks
Clairvoyants
Eastern Orthodox mystics
Eastern Orthodox monks
Greek saints of the Eastern Orthodox Church
Hesychasts
Saints of modern Greece
Emigrants from the Ottoman Empire to Greece
People from Yahyalı
People associated with Koutloumousiou Monastery